Agnes B. Morgan (October 31, 1879 – May 25, 1976) was a director, playwright, actress and theatrical producer.  She is most known for her association with the Neighborhood Playhouse where she was a director and functioned in numerous other roles.

Biography 
Morgan was born in Le Roy, New York to Frank H. Morgan, an editor, and Sarah L. Cutler Morgan, a teacher. Attending Radcliffe College, she received her Bachelor of Arts degree in 1901 and her Master of Arts in 1903. In 1904 she attended George Pierce Baker's 47 Workshop at Harvard University.

She was hired at the Neighborhood Playhouse on the recommendation of one of the Playhouse teachers Sarah Cowell Le Moyne who knew Helen Arthur (who became Morgan's partner). Lewisohn described Morgan as "quiet, serious, watchful." In speaking of the Lewisohn sisters, founders of the Playhouse joining with Morgan and Helen Arthur, Lewisohn added "...never had five people cast in such different molds joined forces with more congeniality."

In speaking of two comedies, Great Catherine: Whom Glory Still Adores by Shaw and The Queen's Enemies by Lord Dunsany, Crowley recalled that "the spirited quality in both productions was largely due to Agnes Morgan's skillful direction. Perhaps Great Catherine was paving the way to her gift in handling burlesque, which was later to create an infectious vogue on Grand Street and Broadway through the [Grand Street Follies]."

Crowley described Morgan as an essential part of the Playhouse:  Agnes Morgan's apprentices were the stage crew, a neighborhood corps of assistant property boys, scene shifters, and painters But her technical facility was such that she was everywhere in the theatre, combining a collection of functions the mere mention of which would drive any "self-respecting" member of the theatre union of today into a decline. Skilled as an actor, she played an occasional role; she developed the technical side of lighting, and had an instinctive gift for direction, as for the function of stage manager. As an amateur she responded to any production need while pursuing her professional career as playwright.

Grand St. Follies:  Neighborhood Playhouse had an in-house burlesque.  While searching for an experimental play (promised to subscribers), Lewisohn suggested that the in-house burlesque be open to the subscribers. It had been the inspiration and creation of Agnes Morgan and Helen Arthur. The following season, staff were concerned as to whether they could equal the success of the first Grand Street Follies. "...it was clear that her genius for brilliant satire had flowered overnight.

Morgan directed thirty-one out of forty-four dramas mounted at the Neighborhood Playhouse between 1915 and its closing in 1927, as well as dance and festival shows. After the Playhouse closed she formed her own company, originally sharing the name of the annual Grand Street Follies and later called Actor-Managers, Inc. which existed until 1939. She directed eight plays on Broadway between 1927 and 1935 as well as three plays for the Federal Theatre Project. In 1931 she wrote the play If Love Were All under the pseudonym Cutler Hatch and staged it as well.

In 1940 Morgan became associate director of the Paper Mill Playhouse in Millburn, New Jersey, a position she held until 1972.

Agnes Morgan apparently met her partner, the lawyer Helen Arthur, while working at the Neighborhood Playhouse. Arthur pre-deceased Morgan on December 10, 1939.

Morgan died on May 25, 1976, in San Bernardino, California.

Broadway stage productions 
Information from the Internet Broadway Database.

Neighborhood Playhouse productions 
Information from Alice Lewisohn Crowley, Neighborhood Playhouse.

References

Sources

General bibliography 
American Women Playwrights, 1900–1930. A checklist. Compiled by Frances Diodato Bzowski. Westport, CT: Greenwood Press, 1992.
American Women Stage Directors of the Twentieth Century. By Anne Fliotsos and Wendy Vierow. Urbana, IL: University of Illinois Press, 2008.
Biography Index. A cumulative index to biographical material in books and magazines. Volume 16: September, 1988-August, 1990. New York: H.W. Wilson Co., 1990.
Biography Index. A cumulative index to biographical material in books and magazines. Volume 19: September, 1993-August, 1994. New York: H.W. Wilson Co., 1994.
The Gay and Lesbian Theatrical Legacy. A biographical dictionary of major figures in American stage history in the pre-Stonewall era. Edited by Billy J. Harbin, Kim Marra, and Robert A. Schanke. Ann Arbor, MI: University of Michigan Press, 2005.
Notable Women in the American Theatre. A biographical dictionary. Edited by Alice M. Robinson, Vera Mowry Roberts, and Milly S. Barranger. New York: Greenwood Press, 1989.
Who's Who of American Women. First edition, 1958–1959. Wilmette, IL: Marquis Who's Who, 1958.
Who's Who of American Women. Second edition, 1961–1962. Wilmette, IL: Marquis Who's Who, 1961.
Who's Who of American Women. Third edition, 1964–1965. Wilmette, IL: Marquis Who's Who, 1963.
Who's Who of American Women. Fourth edition, 1966–1967. Wilmette, IL: Marquis Who's Who, 1965.
Who's Who of American Women. Fifth edition, 1968–1969. Wilmette, IL: Marquis Who's Who, 1967.

External links 
 
 Neighborhood Playhouse records, 1897-1967, 2004, held by the Billy Rose Theatre Division, New York Public Library for the Performing Arts

1879 births
1976 deaths
American librettists
American musical theatre lyricists
American theatre managers and producers
American stage actresses
American theatre directors
Women theatre directors
American lesbian actresses
LGBT theatre directors
LGBT people from New York (state)
People from Le Roy, New York
Radcliffe College alumni
Federal Theatre Project people